The Woodlawn Museum, also known as the Black Mansion, is a  historic estate located a quarter mile from downtown Ellsworth, Maine, at 19 Black House Drive.  Now open to the public as a museum, the property was home to three generations of the Black family, and features many of their possessions.  The family patriarch, John Black, was an agent for a major landowner in the region, and built the mansion house in 1824–27.  The estate features gardens and hiking trails open to the public all year, and self-guided audio tours of house are available between May and October.  Woodlawn was listed on the National Register of Historic Places in 1969.

Description and history
Philadelphia businessman William Bingham purchased a very large tract of land in Maine not long after the American Revolutionary War, and sold half of it in 1792 to an English company.  The company sent John Black, then just eighteen, to Maine to act as its agent.  Black worked in cooperation with Bingham's agent, David Cobb, eventually marrying the latter's daughter.  Cobb gave the couple  of land, of which the present  of the Woodlawn estate are the remnant.  On this property Black built a three-story brick mansion, with elegant Federal and Greek Revival styling.  Bricks for the house were shipped from Philadelphia, and construction by masons from Boston took three years (1824–27).  The building's main facade features a porch across the full width of the main block, supported by Doric columns and topped by a balustrade.  The roof is surrounded by a balustrade with panel sections.  A single story addition to the left of the main block also has a roof ringed by a balustrade.

Behind the main house stand a carriage barn and a sleigh storage building; the latter has been adapted as a function space by the museum.  The family tomb is located near the southern end of the property.  The house was occupied by three generations of Blacks, and the estate was given, complete with most of the house contents, to the Hancock County Trustees of Public Reservations in 1928.  They now manage the property as a museum and public park.

Facilities on the estate include hiking trails, a formal garden, and the only regulation size croquet court in the state.  A community garden, offering small garden plots to area residents, is also available.  Events are scheduled on a regular basis, and there are facilities for private events such as weddings.

References

External links
Woodlawn Museum and Gardens Website Link

Houses completed in 1827
Houses on the National Register of Historic Places in Maine
Georgian architecture in Maine
Buildings and structures in Ellsworth, Maine
Museums in Hancock County, Maine
Parks in Maine
Historic house museums in Maine
Houses in Hancock County, Maine
National Register of Historic Places in Hancock County, Maine
1827 establishments in Maine